Highway 119 (AR 119, Ark. 119, and Hwy. 119) is a former state highway in Mississippi County, Arkansas. Created in 1927, the route connected a Mississippi River levee road to the state highway system until deletion in 2022. It was maintained by the Arkansas Department of Transportation (ArDOT).

Route description
The route began at an access road for a Mississippi River levee at the unincorporated community of Butler and ran west to an intersection at US 61 (the Great River Road) between Rotan and Driver.

History
The route first appeared on the 1927 state highway map. It was turned back to county maintenance on March 16, 2022, by the Arkansas State Highway Commission at the request of Mississippi County to expedite an economic development project (steel mill) being constructed in the area.

Major intersections

References

119
Transportation in Mississippi County, Arkansas